Mihai Vioreanu (born October 3, 1974 in Făgăraș) is a former Romanian rugby union football player and currently a surgeon specialized in orthopedic surgery. He played as a fullback or as centre.

Vioreanu is an experienced, Irish-trained consultant orthopedic surgeon with expertise in knee and hip surgery obtained in Canada and Australia and performing over 500 surgeries yearly.

Club career
During his career in Romania, Vioreanu mostly played for Universitatea Timișoara and was loaned at the end of the 1990s at Dinamo București for a few matches in Continental Shield. Soon after he signed with RC Strasbourg in France. After his stint with French rugby followed a transfer in Ireland, where he played for De La Salle Palmerston for five seasons. He ended his career in 2008 after playing for three seasons at a hospital's rugby union team, his workplace then.

International career
Vioreanu gathered 30 caps for Romania, from his debut in 1994 against England to his last game in 2003 against Namibia. He was a member of his national side for the 5th and 6th  Rugby World Cups in 1999 and 2003. In 1999 he played three matches in the East Group against Australia, USA and Ireland. In 2003 he played all four matches in Pool A against Ireland, Australia, Argentina and Namibia, which was also his final match for the Oaks. He scored nine tries for his national team, 45 points on aggregate.

Career outside rugby
In 1999, Vioreanu graduated Victor Babeș University of Medicine and Pharmacy in Timișoara with honours. He then soon moved to France and just after 9 months to Ireland, where he continued his postgraduate training. He currently resides in Dublin and holds dual citizenship (Romanian and Irish).

Freshly moved to Dublin, he completed his Specialty Training in Orthopaedic Surgery in RCSI. He pursued further sub-specialized training in Primary, Complex and Revision Hip and Knee Replacement at the world-renowned Arthroplasty Centre in Vancouver, Canada. He then travelled to Sydney, Australia during 2013 and 2014 to perform sports knee surgery (i.e. ACL reconstruction, tibial osteotomies, cartilage and meniscal surgery) along expert surgeons - Prof. Justin Roe and Prof. Leo Pinczewski.
In 2014 Mr. Vioreanu was awarded the Asia Pacific ESSKA–APKASS Travelling Fellowship facilitating him to visit the best centers in Sports Knee Surgery in Asia-Pacific (China, Hong-Kong, New-Zealand, Australia and Japan), to learn, discuss and share advanced surgical techniques and participate in academic symposia.

In 2017, Vioreanu was awarded the European ESSKA Osteotomy Traveling Fellowship where he visited high volume joint preserving centers in Europe (Munich, Amsterdam, Lyon and London). This is a prestigious exchange program allowing surgeons to share scientific information, stimulate research and collaborate on an international scale.

Vioreanu is involved in clinical research. He regularly attends and lectures at international courses and meetings. Mr Vioreanu has published a number of high quality clinical studies, book chapters and surgical techniques. A keen teacher, Mr. Vioreanu was the first Orthopaedic Lecturer in RCSI where he designed and delivered a musculoskeletal program for medical students.

Vioreanu joined Sports Surgery Clinic in 2014 and recently Mater Private Hospital, bringing the latest innovations and experience in knee and hip surgery from North America and Australia.

Honours

 Rugby Europe International Championships Winner: 2000

References

External links
 
 
 
 Official website
 Mihai Vioreanu at Sports Surgery Clinic
 Mihai Vioreanu at Mater Private Hospital
 Mihai Vioreanu at Irish Institute for Trauma and Orthopaedic Surgery

1974 births
Living people
Romanian rugby union players
Romania international rugby union players
Irish rugby union players
Rugby union fullbacks
Rugby union centres
SCM Rugby Timișoara players
De La Salle Palmerston players
People from Făgăraș
People from County Dublin
Expatriate rugby union players in France
Expatriate rugby union players in Ireland
Irish orthopaedic surgeons
Romanian orthopaedic surgeons